Jombang Regency is a regency of East Java, Indonesia, situated to the southwest of Surabaya. The capital of the regency is the town of Jombang. The regency has an area of 1,159.48 km2 and population of 1,202,407 at the 2010 census and 1,318,062 at the 2020 census. It became a regency in 1910. It was the  birthplace of Abdurrahman Wahid, the 4th president of Indonesia.

Administrative districts

The regency is divided into twenty-one districts (kecamatan), tabulated below with their areas and population totals from the 2010 census and the 2020 census. The table also includes the number of administrative villages (rural desa and urban kelurahan) in each district, and its postal codes.

Climate

References

External links
 Official site